Bəybabalar is a village in the municipality of Xındırıstan in the Agdam District of Azerbaijan.

References

Populated places in Aghdam District